February 22 - Eastern Orthodox liturgical calendar - February 24

All fixed commemorations below are observed on March 8  (March 7 on leap years) by Eastern Orthodox Churches on the Old Calendar.

For February 23rd, Orthodox Churches on the Old Calendar commemorate the Saints listed on February 10.

Saints

 Hieromartyr Polycarp of Smyrna, Bishop of Smyrna (167)
 Holy 73 Martyrs of Sirmium, under Diocletian (303)
 Martyr Clement, by the sword.
 Martyr Thea, by the sword.
 Venerable Gorgonia the Righteous (370), sister of St. Gregory the Theologian.
 Saint Alexander, founder of the Monastery of the Unsleeping Ones, Constantinople (430) (see also: January 15, July 3)
 Saints John, Antioch, Antoninus, Moses, Zebinas, Polychronius, Moses (another), and Damian, ascetics near Cyrrhus in the Syrian desert (5th century)
 Saint John Theristes ("the Harvester") of Stylos in Calabria (9th or 11th century)  (see also: February 24 )

Pre-Schism Western saints

 Saint Martha, a virgin-martyr beheaded in Astorga in Spain under Decius (251)
 Saint Polycarp, a priest in Rome noted for ministering to those in prison for their faith (c. 300)
 Saint Romana, a virgin born in Rome who reposed at the age of eighteen while living as an anchoress in a cave on the banks of the Tiber in Italy (324)
 Saints Syncrotas, Antigonus, Rutilus, Libius, Senerotas and Rogatianus, martyrs at Sirmium in Pannonia (4th century)
 Saint Florentius of Seville, Confessor, a saint much venerated in Seville in Spain  (c. 485)
 Saint Felix of Brescia, twentieth Bishop of Brescia (c. 650)
 Saint Jurmin, an East Anglian prince, son or nephew of King Anna of East Anglia (653)
 Saint Boswell (Boisil), Abbot of Melrose Abbey in Scotland (c. 661)  (see also: February 24)
 Saint Mildburga (Milburgh), Abbess of Wenlock Priory (715)
 Saint Medrald (Mérald, Méraut), a monk at Saint-Evroult (Ebrulfus) of Ouche in France, who later became Abbot of Vendôme (c. 850)
 Saint Willigis, Archbishop of Mainz (1011)

Post-Schism Orthodox saints

 Venerable Damian of Esphigmenou Monastery, on Mount Athos (1280)
 Saint Cosmas of Zograf Monastery, Mount Athos (1281)
 Saint Moses of White Lake Monastery, monk (1480)
 New Monk-martyr Damian of Philotheou and Kissavos, at Larissa (1586)
 New Hieromartyr Lazarus of the Peloponnese (c. 1618)
 Venerable Polycarp of Bryansk, monk of Bryansk (1620-1621)
 Saint Nazarius, Abbot of Valaam Monastery (1809)
 Saint Seraphim (Zenobius), Schema-Metropolitan of Tetritskaro, Georgia, monk of Glinsk Monastery (1985)

New martyrs and confessors

 New Hieromartyr Paul Kushnikov, Priest (1918)
 New Hieromartyr Michael Edlinsky, Archpriest, of Kiev (1937)  (see also: November 17)
 New Hieromartyr Alexis Nikolsky, Priest (1938)
 New Hieromartyr Nicholas Dimitrov, Priest (1938)
 New Hieromartyr Michael Razhkin, Priest (1938)
 Martyr Sergius Borodavkin (1938)
 New Hieromartyr Sergius (Bukashkin), Hieromonk, of Novo-Alexandrovka, Moscow (1938)
 New Hieromartyr Antipas (Kyrillov), hieromonk, of Tatarintsevo, Moscow (1938)
 New Hieromartyr Philaret (Pryakhin), Abbot, of Trubino, Tver (1942)

Other commemorations

 Repose of Archimandrite Agapit (Belovidov) of Optina Monastery (1922)
 Repose of Elder Sabbas (Stavrobouniotes) of Cyprus (1985)
 Uncovering of the relics (1998) of Blessed Matrona of Moscow (1952)

Icon gallery

Notes

References

Sources
 February 23 / March 8. Orthodox Calendar (PRAVOSLAVIE.RU).
 March 8 / February 23. Holy Trinity Russian Orthodox Church (A parish of the Patriarchate of Moscow).
 February 23. OCA - The Lives of the Saints.
 The Autonomous Orthodox Metropolia of Western Europe and the Americas (ROCOR). St. Hilarion Calendar of Saints for the year of our Lord 2004. St. Hilarion Press (Austin, TX). p. 17.
 The Twenty-Third Day of the Month of February. Orthodoxy in China.
 February 23. Latin Saints of the Orthodox Patriarchate of Rome.
 The Roman Martyrology. Transl. by the Archbishop of Baltimore. Last Edition, According to the Copy Printed at Rome in 1914. Revised Edition, with the Imprimatur of His Eminence Cardinal Gibbons. Baltimore: John Murphy Company, 1916. pp. 56–57.
 Rev. Richard Stanton. A Menology of England and Wales, or, Brief Memorials of the Ancient British and English Saints Arranged According to the Calendar, Together with the Martyrs of the 16th and 17th Centuries. London: Burns & Oates, 1892. p. 81-82.
Greek Sources
 Great Synaxaristes:  23 ΦΕΒΡΟΥΑΡΙΟΥ. ΜΕΓΑΣ ΣΥΝΑΞΑΡΙΣΤΗΣ.
  Συναξαριστής. 23 Φεβρουαρίου. ECCLESIA.GR. (H ΕΚΚΛΗΣΙΑ ΤΗΣ ΕΛΛΑΔΟΣ). 
Russian Sources
  8 марта (23 февраля). Православная Энциклопедия под редакцией Патриарха Московского и всея Руси Кирилла (электронная версия). (Orthodox Encyclopedia - Pravenc.ru).
  23 февраля (ст.ст.) 8 марта 2014 (нов. ст.). Русская Православная Церковь Отдел внешних церковных связей. (DECR).

February in the Eastern Orthodox calendar